The 2003 Big East Conference baseball tournament was held at Commerce Bank Ballpark in Bridgewater, New Jersey. This was the nineteenth annual Big East Conference baseball tournament. The  won their second tournament championship in a row and claimed the Big East Conference's automatic bid to the 2003 NCAA Division I baseball tournament. Notre Dame would go on to win five championships in a row.

Format and seeding 
The Big East baseball tournament was a 4 team double elimination tournament in 2003. The top four regular season finishers were seeded one through four based on conference winning percentage only.

Bracket

Jack Kaiser Award 
Javi Sanchez was the winner of the 2003 Jack Kaiser Award. Sanchez was a junior catcher for Notre Dame.

References 

Tournament
Big East Conference Baseball Tournament
Big East Conference baseball tournament
Big East Conference baseball tournament
Baseball in New Jersey
Bridgewater Township, New Jersey
College sports in New Jersey
Sports competitions in New Jersey
Sports in Somerset County, New Jersey
Tourist attractions in Somerset County, New Jersey